Sonar Kollektiv is a German record label founded in the late 1990s by the DJ and producer team Jazzanova(Claas Brieler, Roskow Kretschmann, Stefan Leisering, Axel Reinemer). The label specializes in downtempo music. The intention was to create an independent record label and publisher connected to a worldwide independent distribution network. They have more than 200 catalogue releases over the years.  The label is promoted in the United States by Prommer, Inc.

Artists
Extended Spirit
Forss
Clara Hill
Jazzanova
Daniel Paul
Micatone
Sequel
Benny Sings
Lucifour M

References

External links
 Official label site

German independent record labels
Record labels established in 1998
Electronic music record labels
IFPI members